Aegosoma scabricorne is a species of long-horned beetles belonging to the family Cerambycidae.

Description
It is one of the biggest long-horned beetles in Europe. Body is elongated, finely pubescent, of a reddish yellow color. Head is narrowed behind the eyes. Antennae are composed by 11 segments, rough in the male. Prothorax is narrowed forward, obtusely dentate at the basal angle. Elytra show two weak longitudinal ribs. In males the antennae reach the extremity of the body, while in the females they are a little shorter than the body. The abdomen is  glabrous, with a protruding oviduct.

Distribution
This species is present in central and southern Europe , Asia (Japan, China, Indonesia ..) and in the Middle East (Iran, Caucasus).

Biology
Adults can be found from June to August. Larvae live in the trunk of old trees. Life cycle lasts at least three years.

References

External links
 Catalogue of life
 Animal Diversity
 Cerambycoidea

Woodboring beetles
Prioninae
Beetles described in 1763
Taxa named by Giovanni Antonio Scopoli